Tubulin beta chain is a protein that in humans is encoded by the TUBB gene.

Interactions 

TUBB has been shown to interact with NCOA6 and SYT9.

See also 
 Tubulin

References

Further reading